Dr.M.Narmadha born 11th April is a celebrated popular third generation heritage violinist who performs solo violin concerts in both Carnatic and Hindustani classical systems of Indian Music.

She is the Daughter of the legendary violinist Padma Bhusan, Padmashree Awardee guruji Shri M.S.Gopalakrishnan.Trained in Violin music, simultaneously in both Hindustani and Carnatic music with her grandfather, Parur A. Sundaram Iyer, her father M.S.Gopalakrishnan and in vocal music with mother Smt Meenakshi Gopalakrishnan, she won her doctoral degree from Delhi University as a U. G. C. fellow in both Hindistani and Caranatic Music systems with the renowned sitar player Pandit Devabrata (Debu) Chaudhuri and musicologist Dr. K. G. Ginde for her comparative studies in Indian Music ragas and later published as ‘Indian Music and Sancara in Raagas’ which has sold more than 500 copies now.

Kalaimamani, Kalashree, Vani Kala Sudhakara Dr.M.Narmadha  renowned versatile popular third generation violinist, daughter and disciple of the legendary Violinist, PadmaShri  PadmaBhushan Awardee M. S. Gopalakrishnan and Meenakshi Gopalakrishnan is a happy combination of a violinist, musicologist and vocalist. Dr. M.Narmadha received her Phd in Music from Delhi University as a Senior University Grants Commission {UGC} fellow, under the able guidance of Sitar virtuoso Prof.Debu Chaudhuri and renowned musicologist Dr.K.G.Ginde..A career gold medalist, top grade artiste of All India Radio and outstanding empanelled artist ICCR ,outstanding empanelled artist Ministry of Culture, she  has performed violin solo, Jugalbandhi  and duets in both Hindustani and Carnatic classical styles with equal command, thanks to her initial simultaneous rigorous training in both styles.  Initially, she got trained under her grandfather Parur A. Sundaram Iyer,  after whom the 'Parur'  style has been named  (He was the pioneer who introduced Hindustani Music in South India and introduced the Violin in North India as early as 1925.) 

Having completed more than 10,000 concerts in 5 decades of Musical journey, she is a brilliant Academician, Composer, Musicologist, Vocalist and her Musical foundation “Sancara” coaches students in vocal and in violin. Dr.M.Narmadha, has charmed audiences all over the world like  USA, UK, Russia,  Holland, South Africa, Australia Singapore, Barcelona , Malaysia, Hongkong She has received the Best Violinist award by the Music Academy, Madras eight times consecutively. She performs in total versatility in vivacious expressions in Jugalbandi collaboration concerts, Fusion Concerts and Thematic special concerts in various languages embracing classical and semi-classical zones.

Early Initiation into Music 

Born in Bangalore, D.M.Narmadha developed a great fascination at the tender age if three constantly listening to the sound of Violin being practiced and performed by her grandfather and father. It would be 4AM in the morning when MSG Guruji was practicing the Varnams and she almost learnt more than 10 Varnams when she was barley six by the constant exposure to Indian Music at Sangeeta Vilas, 110  Appar swamy Koil street, Mylapore which is even today a popular destination for Musicians world wide.

She was easily the competition winner in Interschool and collegiate competitions and progressed ahead to bloom to become a violinist par excellence. Highly talented child that she was she participated and won prizes in oratorical competition and also acted in school drama during the annual school day festival at St.Thomas Convent, St.Raphaels and Vidya Mandir at Mylapore, Chennai.

Musical Career 

Dr.M.Narmadha started her early performances with her father in violin Duet concerts and has been performing from more than 5 decades now. Being passionate about Academic Musical studies, she pursued to win her bachelors and Masters from Queen Mary's college at Madras University in the year 1985 and progressing further to complete her Doctoral studies from the University of Delhi.

Her Research on Indian Music was one of the rarest findings comparing the unique accent on the Saptaswaras which gave every note a unique character to make the note distinguished by its ability to be included by its specific characteristics as part of Carnatic and Hindustani.

Dr.M.Narmadha admires Tyagaraja's musical output "Sa Ri Ga Ma Pa Da Ni, Vara saptaswara"

Her extensive musical research spanning for a several years included musical guides from both Carnatic and Hindustani music. She delved deeply in explicitly expressing the shade tone, nuance and the contour of the melodic passages by including trails of Alaap Passages rendered by renowned musicians and also the Sancaris in Sangeeta Sapradaya Pradarshini.

Indian Music and Sancara in Raagas  is an extensive study dating from Natya Shastra oh Bharat 2century B.C to Sangeeta Sampradaya Pradarshini of Subbaram Dikshadar, 19th Century A.D. Her research embraced in total equipoise both the academic and performing aspects of Indian Classical Music and Indian Musicology.

She Won her Doctoctorate, M.A.Ph.D in the year 1996 from the University of Delhi as a senior research UGC Felloe scholar.

Pursuing her Musical Passion, she got her employment in All India Radio, Information and Broadcasting ever since 25 years now.

Musical Concerts and Lecture Demonstrations 

Endowed with effortless bowing and elegant precision, melodies directly appealing to the heart, treading the path of trend and tradition, completing  a close to 5 decade service to Indian Music, Dr.M.Narmadha, has charmed audiences all over the world with her vivacious expressions on her Violin marked by total involvement, complete commitment and dedication and occupies a very important place in the world of Indian classical music.

Having started her career concerts through the Akandam(non-stop musical offering)at Tyagaraja Vidwat Samajam, Mylapore, Chennai she progressed into performing duet concerts with her father in India and abroad. She has toured all over the world including USA, UK, Holland, South Africa, Australia, Singapore, Spain, Malaysia, Hongkong etc. 

Musicology being a forte of Dr.M.Narmadha's academic pursuits she performed various lecture demonstrations all over India and Abroad besides she has been a prolific writer of articles in musicology, and she has authored several books on Indian Music. She was awarded the Best Violinist award by the Music Academy, Madras, eight times consecutively.

Dr. M. Narmadha, also performed several Lecture Demonstrations and workshops in various places and that too free of cost for students, a few of them are cited below:

 Raagamadhuri, Mumbai ,Shivali cultural Society Mumbai.
 ShanmukhanandaSaba Mumbai, Chembur Fine arts ,
 The National university, Singapore.
 The Annamalai university, Chidambaram ,
 The Karnatak college of music

Dr.M.Narmadha as a Cultural Ambassador of India 

 In Dr.M.Narmadha’s festival of India tour Russia 2018 highlighted and showcased the beautiful relationship between the Russian Folk Song Kalinga to Dr.Narmadha’s own composition Arohara.
 Besides Dr.M.Narmadha composed a 7 beat song on a comparative basis to the flamingo dance steps of Russia.
 In Spain, Madrid she answered questions of many Jazz violinists  while linking the Gayaki aang Hindustani music , Gamakas South Indian Music to the innovations and the glides in Jazz performances.
 The Indian element of creativity was explained by Dr.M.Narmadha in her performances.

Awards 

Dr.M.Narmadha has won several awards for career excellence in performance and Lecture Demonstrations, In recognition of her contribution to Indian Classical Violin Music. 

Few of her awards include

 The Violin Excellence Kanchi Jagadguru Sri Jayendra Saraswati National Eminence Award by Sri Shanmukhananda Fine Arts & Sangeetha Sabha 
 Kerala Sangeetha Nataka Akademi Award 2018 for excellence in Violin
 Kalaimamani ‘by the Govt. of  Tamil Nadu for excellence in  Violin
 Shanmukhananda Sangeeta Shiromani by the Shanmukhananda Sangeeta Sabha, Mumbai  ,
 Yami Award for the Best Accomplished Violinist  by Music Today Group , 
 Mumbai and Shantidoot Award, from Mahamountirth Ashram Ujjain , 
 Bharatiya Vidya Bhavan Excellence Award ,
 Chennai and Tantri Vadya Visharada ,San Fran Cisco. 

The Government if India Ministry of culture awarded the Senior research fellow ship for pursuing a very special study for the unique contribution of the Parur MSG style to Indian Music.

Music Foundation 
Dr.M.Narmadha’s music Foundation School “SANCARA” Perpetuates Parur MSG Violin legacy , teaching  Violin, Vocal and Musicology. Sancara, Dr.M.Narmadha’s music foundation is training several  students in violin at present.

External links 
 http://www.facebook.com/drmnarmadhaviolin
 http://archives.chennaionline.com/musicseason99/profile/narmadha.html 
 http://www.sabhash.com/artist/22/dr.-m.-narmadha.htm 

Carnatic violinists
Hindustani violinists
Living people
21st-century violinists
Year of birth missing (living people)
Indian violinists
Indian musicologists
Indian composers
Indian women singers
Recipients of the Kerala Sangeetha Nataka Akademi Award